was a Japanese professional baseball manager. He managed the Tokyu Flyers in the Japan Pacific League.

References

Hokkaido Nippon-Ham Fighters managers
1895 births
1970 deaths